Whitehouse is an unincorporated community in Henry County, in the U.S. state of Georgia.

History
The community was named for a white house which once stood prominently at the town site. The name is sometimes spelled out "White House". A post office called White House was established in 1836, and remained in operation until 1902.

References

Unincorporated communities in Henry County, Georgia
Unincorporated communities in Georgia (U.S. state)